Battle of Wissembourg may refer to:

First Battle of Wissembourg (1793), in October 1793, during the War of the First Coalition 
Second Battle of Wissembourg (1793), in December 1793, during the War of the First Coalition
Battle of Wissembourg (1870), first battle of the Franco-Prussian War